The Fronalpstock is a mountain of the Glarus Alps, located east of Glarus in the canton of Glarus.

References

External links

 Fronalpstock on Hikr

Mountains of the Alps
Mountains of Switzerland
Mountains of the canton of Glarus
Two-thousanders of Switzerland